Lone Star is a 1996 American neo-Western mystery film written, edited, and directed by John Sayles and set in a small town in South Texas. The ensemble cast features Chris Cooper, Kris Kristofferson, Matthew McConaughey and Elizabeth Peña and deals with a sheriff's investigation into the murder of one of his predecessors. Filmed on location along the Rio Grande in southern and southwestern Texas, the film received critical acclaim, with critics regarding it as a high point of 1990s independent cinema as well as one of Sayles' best films. It was nominated for an Academy Award for Best Writing, and also appeared on the ballot for the AFI's 10 Top 10 in the western category. The film was a box office success, grossing $13 million against its $3–5 million budget.

Plot

Sam Deeds is the sheriff of Rio County in Frontera, Texas. A native of Frontera, Sam returned two years ago and was elected sheriff. Sam's late father had been the legendary Sheriff Buddy Deeds, who is beloved by the town, remembered as a unique individual with a great sense of fairness and justice. As a teenager Sam had problems with his father and the pair routinely argued and fought.

Sam is particularly disapproving of efforts by local business leader Mercedes Cruz and Buddy's former chief deputy, Mayor Hollis Pogue, to enlarge and rename the local courthouse in Buddy's honor; he considers it an unneeded waste of taxpayers' money. As a teenager, Sam had been in love with Mercedes's daughter Pilar, but the courtship was strongly opposed by Buddy and Mercedes. After a chance meeting, Sam and the widowed Pilar, now a local teacher, slowly resume their relationship.

Colonel Delmore Payne has recently arrived in town as the commander of the local U.S. Army base. Delmore is the son of Otis "Big O" Payne, a local nightclub owner and leading figure in the African-American community. The two are estranged because of Otis's serial womanizing and abandonment of Delmore's mother when Delmore was a child. Two off-duty sergeants from the base discover a human skeleton on an old shooting range on the base along with a Masonic ring, a Rio County sheriff's badge, and later, an expended pistol bullet, very unusual on a rifle range. Sam brings in Texas Ranger Ben Wetzel to help with the case. Wetzel tells Sam that forensics identify the skeleton as that of Charlie Wade, the infamously corrupt and cruel sheriff who preceded Buddy. Wade mysteriously disappeared in 1957, taking $10,000 in county funds, after which Buddy became sheriff.

Sam investigates the events leading up to Wade's murder. He learns that Wade terrorized the local African-American and Mexican communities, including extorting money from local business owners on a monthly basis and numerous murders where he asks his innocent victims to show him any weapon they might have, to then justify shooting them for "resisting arrest". Wade used this method to murder, in front of Deputy Hollis, Mercedes' husband, Eladio, having discovered he was running an illegal smuggling operation in Rio County without bribing Wade.

Sam also uncovers secrets about his father's nearly 30-year term as sheriff that reveal Buddy's own corruption. He visits Wesley Birdsong, a Native American and a roadside tourist stand owner, who reveals that Buddy was a wild young adult after his service in the Korean War but settled down after becoming a deputy sheriff and marrying Sam's mother; but he reveals that Buddy did have a mistress, whose name Wesley claims to have forgotten. Sam travels to San Antonio, where he visits his marginally mentally ill ex-wife Bunny and searches through his father's things, where he discovers love letters from Buddy's mistress. Otis tells Sam that Buddy's focus was on the county political machine while Wade's focus was on money. The janitor at the sheriff's office reveals to Sam that he worked on Buddy's home while incarcerated in the local jail. A local reporter uncovers that Buddy forcibly evicted residents of a small community to make a lake that made Frontera a popular tourist destination with Buddy and Hollis receiving lakefront property.

Sam confronts Hollis and Otis about Wade's murder. Wade discovered Otis was running an illegal gambling operation at the nightclub, after he had previously warned Otis against running numbers in the club. A furious Wade violently attacked Otis, ordered him to hand over the monthly extortion money, and then was about to use his "resisting arrest" setup to kill Otis. Buddy arrived just as Hollis shot Wade to prevent Otis's murder. The three buried the body and took the $10,000 from the county and gave it to Mercedes—who was destitute after Eladio's recent death—to buy her restaurant. Hollis reveals that Buddy and Mercedes did not take up until sometime later. Sam decides to drop the issue, saying it will remain an unsolved mystery. Hollis voices concern that, when the skeleton is revealed to be Wade, people will assume Buddy killed him to take his job, to which Sam states that Buddy's legend can handle it.

Pilar meets Sam at an old drive-in theater where Sam shows her an old photo of Buddy and Mercedes and tells her Eladio died 18 months, rather than "a couple months", before she was born, revealing Buddy is Pilar's father. Both are hurt over the deception but decide that, since she cannot have any more children, they will continue their romantic relationship, despite the knowledge that they are half-siblings.

Cast

 Kris Kristofferson as Charlie Wade
 Matthew McConaughey as Buddy Deeds
 Chris Cooper as Sam Deeds
 Elizabeth Peña as Pilar Cruz
 Míriam Colón as Mercedes Cruz
 Clifton James as Hollis Pogue
 Jeff Monahan as young Hollis Pogue
 Ron Canada as Otis Payne
 Gabriel Casseus as young Otis Payne
 Carmen de Lavallade as Carolyn Payne
 Joe Morton as Delmore Payne
 Eddie Robinson as Chet Payne 
 Frances McDormand as Bunny
 Stephen Mendillo as Sgt. Cliff
 LaTanya Richardson as Sgt. Priscilla Worth 
 Jesse Borrego as Danny Padilla 
 Tony Plana as Ray
 Oni Faida Lampley as Celie Payne
 Eleese Lester as Molly
 Tony Frank as Fenton
 Gordon Tootoosis as Wesley Birdsong
 Beatrice Winde as Minnie Bledsoe
 Chandra Wilson as Athena Johnson
 Richard Reyes as Jorge

Production

The movie was filmed in Del Rio, Eagle Pass and Laredo, Texas.

Reception

Critical response
On review aggregator Rotten Tomatoes, the film has an approval rating of 92% based on 52 reviews, with a rating average of 8.6/10. The website's critical consensus reads: "Smart and absorbing, Lone Star represents a career high point for writer-director John Sayles -- and '90s independent cinema in general." On Metacritic, it has a score of 78% based on reviews from 22 critics, indicating "generally favorable reviews". Two years after release, Jack Mathews of the Los Angeles Times declared it "critically acclaimed and darn near commercial". In retrospect from 2004, William Arnold of the Seattle Post-Intelligencer said that the film was "widely regarded as Sayles' masterpiece", declaring that it had "captured the zeitgeist of the '90s as successfully as "Chinatown" did the '70s".

Writing at the time of release, Janet Maslin of The New York Times said, "This long, spare, contemplatively paced film, scored with a wide range of musical styles and given a sun-baked clarity by Stuart Dryburgh's cinematography, is loaded with brief, meaningful encounters... And it features a great deal of fine, thoughtful acting, which can always be counted on in a film by Mr. Sayles". "All the film's characters are flesh and blood", Maslin added, pointing particularly to the portrayals by Kristofferson, Canada, James, Morton and Colon. Film critics Dennis West and Joan M. West of Cineaste praised the psychological aspects of the film, writing, "Lone Star strikingly depicts the personal psychological boundaries that confront many citizens of Frontera as a result of living in such close proximity to the border". Ann Hornaday for the Austin American-Statesman declared it "a work of awesome sweep and acute perception", judging it "the most accomplished film of [Sayles'] 17-year career". The Washington Post writer Hal Hinson characterized it as "a carefully crafted, unapologetically literary accomplishment."

Awards
Wins
 Lone Star Film & Television Awards: Best Actor, Chris Cooper; Best Director, John Sayles; Best Film; Best Screenplay, John Sayles; Best Supporting Actor, Ron Canada; Best Supporting Actress, Frances McDormand; 1996.
 Belgian Syndicate of Cinema Critics; Grand Prix
 Independent Spirit Awards: Independent Spirit Award; Best Supporting Female, Elizabeth Peña; 1997.
 Bravo Awards: NCLR Bravo Award Outstanding Actress in a Feature Film, Elizabeth Peña; Special Achievement Award Outstanding Feature Film; 1997.
 Satellite Awards: Golden Satellite Award; Best Motion Picture Screenplay - Original, John Sayles; 1997.
 Society of Texas Film Critics Awards: Best Director, John Sayles; Best Screenplay, John Sayles.
 Southeastern Film Critics Association Awards: SEFCA Award; Best Director, John Sayles; 1997.

Nominations
 Academy Awards: Oscar; Best Writing, Screenplay Written Directly for the Screen, John Sayles; 1997.
 Bravo Awards: NCLR Bravo Award; Outstanding Actor in a Feature Film, Tony Plana; 1996.
 British Academy of Film and Television Arts: BAFTA Film Award; Best Screenplay - Original, John Sayles; 1997.
 Broadcast Film Critics Association Awards: BFCA Award Best Picture; 1997.
 Casting Society of America: Artios; Best Casting for Feature Film, Drama, Avy Kaufman; 1997.
 Golden Globes: Golden Globe;  Best Screenplay - Motion Picture, John Sayles; 1997.
 Independent Spirit Awards: Independent Spirit Award; Best Feature, R. Paul Miller and Maggie Renzil; Best Male Lead, Chris Cooper; Best Screenplay, John Sayles; 1997.
 Satellite Awards: Golden Satellite Award; Best Motion Picture - Drama, R. Paul Miller and Maggie Renzi; 1997.
 Writers Guild of America: WGA Award (Screen); Best Screenplay Written Directly for the Screen, John Sayles; 1997.

Honors
The film is recognized by American Film Institute in these lists:
 2008: AFI's 10 Top 10:
 Nominated Western Film

References

External links

 
 
 
 
 
 Lone Star essay at Bad Subjects magazine by Tomás Sandoval (discussed the historical aspects of film)
  by Siskel & Ebert
 
 Ann Hornaday, "The 34 best political movies ever made" The Washington Post Jan. 23, 2020), ranked #10
 Interviews with Cast and Director of Lone Star (1996) on Texas Archive of the Moving Image

1996 films
1996 independent films
1990s mystery films
1996 romantic drama films
1996 Western (genre) films
American independent films
American mystery films
American romantic drama films
American Western (genre) films
Castle Rock Entertainment films
Films directed by John Sayles
Films set in Texas
Films shot in Texas
Incest in film
Neo-Western films
Films with screenplays by John Sayles
Sony Pictures Classics films
Films about Mexican Americans
Films scored by Mason Daring
1990s English-language films
1990s American films